The Jewish presence in north east England is focused on a number of important towns.

Gateshead

Gateshead is the home to a sizable community of Haredi Jews, acclaimed for its higher educational institutions. Talmudic students from many countries come to Gateshead to attend its yeshivas and kollels. Young Jewish women come to study at the Teacher Training College and Beis Chaya Rochel.

Based in the Bensham area, the community includes a few hundred families.

The community was established at the end of the 19th century when Eastern European Jewish refugees, Eliezer Adler and Zachariah Bernstone chose to leave the Newcastle upon Tyne congregation, which they viewed as too lenient in religious matters, and crossed the river to set up a new synagogue. Following the Holocaust, Gateshead became home to the largest Orthodox Jewish education complex in postwar Europe, and the most significant outside of the United States and Israel. This can partly be attributed to the arrival of Orthodox Jewish refugees who were fleeing the European mainland during the Nazi era. As a result, Gateshead became an important centre of Torah Judaism.

And it was Reb Dovid Dryan in 1941, whose Torah permeated soul conceived the idea – wild impractical and heroic – of setting up a Kolel inGateshead. In September 1941 (Elul 5740) he sent letters to 20 prominent Rabbonim in England inviting them to join him in making his latest dream a reality.

The Gateshead Talmudical College is an important and well known Haredi advanced yeshiva in Gateshead attracting students from all over the world. Gateshead has the only expanding Jewish community in the North East. It is also the largest.

List of yeshivas in Gateshead 
 Beer Hatorah
 Tiferes Ya'akov
 Gateshead Yeshiva
 Sunderland Yeshiva

List of seminaries in Gateshead 
 Beis Chaya Rochel
 Jewish Teachers Training College - known as 'The Old Sem'
Pictures of Jewish institutions in Gateshead

Newcastle

No records have been found of Jews being resident in Newcastle before 1830 although there is a tradition that the community dates from 1775. It is thought, however, that over 500 years prior to this Jews resided in Silver Street (formerly known as Jew Gate).  
In 1830, a cemetery was acquired and by 1831 the community number 100. On 8 October 1832 the congregation was formally established. The cathedral bells were rung when the first synagogue, in Temple Street, was officially opened on 13 July 1838. The Newcastle Courant published a headline in Hebrew.

By 1845 the congregation had grown to 33 adults and 33 children. Through the course of time nearly all the original founders either died or had left the city, but the influx of Polish and Russian immigrants had more than replaced this loss.

An imposing stone building was erected in Leazes Park Road in 1880 and consecrated by the Chief Rabbi. At that time the number of Jews in Newcastle was about 750. The congregation was in being until 1978

Sir Israel Brodie– the first Chief Rabbi to be knighted, was born in Newcastle in 1895.

There were many more developments and synagogues in Newcastle during the 20th century: Corporation Street Synagogue (1904–1924), Jesmond Synagogue (1914–1986), Ravensworth Terrace Synagogue (1925–1969), and Gosforth and Kenton Hebrew Congregation (1947–1984)
 
With the drift of population from the West End of Newcastle, Jesmond synagogue was consecrated in 1914 leaving the oldest, the Leazes Park Road Synagogue in the centre of the city. A third synagogue was built in Gosforth, the Gosforth and Kenton Hebrew congregation. Eventually the running of the three Orthodox Congregations was considered as being uneconomical and with a declining population in other parts of the town a new purpose built Community Centre and Synagogue was built in Gosforth at Culzean Park in an area in which the majority of Jews resided. A new Reform movement Synagogue was built in 1986 nearby and continues to flourish.

In March 2021, the 300 seat purpose built Culzean Park Synagogue was down to its last 50 members and consequently, was sold to developers. The Synagogue has now moved into the Lionel Jacobson House - Community Centre down the road on 20 Graham Park Road.

Sunderland

The first Jewish settlement in Sunderland was in 1755 and the first congregation was established in about 1768. The Sunderland Congregation was the first regional community to be represented on the Board of Deputies of British Jews. Rabbi Shmaryahu Yitzchak Bloch ministered in Sunderland in the early 20th century.

At the 2001 census, 114 people of Jewish faith were recorded as living in Sunderland, a vanishingly small percentage. There was no Jewish community before 1750, though subsequently a number of Jewish merchants from across the UK and Europe settled in Sunderland. The Sunderland Synagogue  on Ryhope Road (opened in 1928) closed at the end of March 2006.

The Sunderland Beth Hamedrash was established in Villiers St in about 1890 which is still standing. In 1930 it moved to a purpose-built building in Mowbray Road. It closed in 1984. The building is no longer extant.

The Sunderland Talmudical College, a Haredi yeshiva  founded in the city in 1945, relocated to Gateshead in 1990.

The North-East Joel Intract Memorial Home for Aged Jews was opened in Sunderland in 1963 and closed in 1998.

The Jewish community in Sunderland has fallen to very few in recent years.

Hartlepool

The Jewish faith in Hartlepool in the 20th century was at an incredible decline. The only known Jewish synagogue in the years prior to the year 2000 was led by Rabbi Robinson, a converted Catholic. The synagogue closed some time around 2003.

Sources 

North East
Jewish history